A garden festival is a festival and exposition held to celebrate the arts of gardening, garden design, landscaping and landscape architecture. There are local garden festivals, regional garden festivals, national garden festivals and international garden festivals. The idea probably originated with Germany's Bundesgartenschau. The UK held five garden festivals in the period 1984–1992.

To qualify as an international exhibition, an expo must be recognised by the Bureau International des Expositions (BIE), which was established by a diplomatic international convention, signed in Paris, in 1928. Horticultural expos can also be recognised by the International Association of Horticultural Producers (IAHP / AIPH). To qualify as a national exhibition, a garden festival must be recognised by a national government.

Because garden design is becoming more popular and featuring on TV, there is an ever-growing number of garden festivals: permanent and temporary, official and non-official. One of the best known is International Garden Festival held on a permanent site at Chaumont in France. Despite the name, Chaumont does not come within the BIE definition of an 'international' festival. Other shows feature garden design but describe themselves as 'flower shows'.  The best-known example in this category, the Chelsea Flower Show, emphasises garden design.  It spun off a Chelsea Fringe events in 2012 which featured a variety of unusual gardens and gardening across London.

List of International Garden Festivals (BIE recognised)

List of other garden festivals

References
Andrew C. Theokas Grounds for Review: The Garden Festival in Urban Planning and Design (Liverpool University Press, 2004 )

External links

AIPH official website
BIE official website

Landscape
Festivals
Flower festivals